Matriz is the fifth studio album by Brazilian rock singer Pitty, produced by Rafael Ramos and released on 26 April 2019.

It was preceded by its own tour, "Tour Matriz", initiated in 2018 when the singer was still doing studio work. The second half of the tour started soon after the album's release.

Concept 
Pitty explained that the album tells the story of a blueswoman who "departs from the cotton field, puts her viola in the bag and goes to the big city in search of better opportunities. It's a kind of return from an aesthetic and cultural self-exile". She invited Lazzo Matumbi to guest perform on the album because she considers him to be part of "this fundamental Bahia".

Promotion

Singles 
On 20 March 2019, the singer released the song "Noite Inteira" as the first single and with an animated clip directed by Carlos Pedreañez.

On 12 March 2021, Pitty announced the release of "Bahia Blues" as another single from the album. A video to the same track was released on the following day.

On 24 March 2021, she released "Motor" as yet another single  and video from the album.

"Te Conecta" was the main single of the album, released on 10 September 2018 with a video. The single was certified gold after reaching 8 million streams, which is equivalent to the sale of around 40 mil copies. The clip was directed by Cisco Vasques and produced by Otavio Augusto, Iara Medeiros and Joanna Jourdan.

Track listing 

LP

K7

Critical reception 

Silvio Essinger from O Globopraised Pitty and the album's sounds, saying that "even Pitty's ventures into reggae — "Te conecta" and "Sol quadrado" (featuring Larissa Luz) — are built with efficacy and balance and do not distune from the group of tracks of this album with impressive sound profoundness and international-level production."

Paulo Floro from O Grito! magazine said this is Pitty's best album ever, in which she rendezvoused with her African roots. According to him, "Matriz brings Pitty in her best era, very confident, mature and free."

Matriz was elected one of the 25 best Brazilian albums of the first semester of 2019 by the Associação Paulista de Críticos de Arte.

Accolades

Personnel 
 Pitty – lead and backing vocals, piano, mouth percussion and claps 
 Martin Mendonça – guitars, acoustic guitar and claps
 Guilherme Almeida – bass
 Daniel Weksler – drums, claps
 Paulo Kishimoto – piano, synthesizer, Hammond, percussion, lap steel and claps

Notes

References 

2019 albums
Pitty albums